Robertson is a town in the Southern Highlands of New South Wales, Australia, in Wingecarribee Shire.

Robertson is known for its high annual rainfall and fertile soil. It was previously covered by an extensive temperate rainforest, most of which has been cleared for farming though remnants such as Robertson Nature Reserve still exist. The town is colloquially known as "Robbo" by the locals.

The town is surrounded by lush pasture used for beef and dairy production. It was once famous for cheese production; its distance from, and poor transport to, the Sydney markets meant that in the early days fresh milk was not a viable industry and so the key dairy industries were butter and cheese. The remnants of the cheese industry are seen with one of the old cheese factories remaining in the town; it has been converted into a commercial row of shops. There is also the remnants of an old butter factory at the western end of town. Robertson is now more widely known for potato growing and is the home of the "Big Potato". The Big Potato was built in the 1970s by a local potato grower. Robertson is also where the 1995 movie Babe was filmed.

History

Robertson is named after former Premier of New South Wales Sir John Robertson, whose 1861 Land Act cleared the way for the establishment of the town. Before then it was called Yarrawa Bush.

Population
According to the 2021 census, there were 2,017 people living in Robertson.

The next most common country of birth was England at 5.6%. 89.0% of people spoke only English at home. The most common responses for religion were No Religion 28.9%, Anglican 25.2% and Catholic 17.2%.

Events

In February or March of each year the Robertson Show is held, featuring "The Great Australian Potato Race".

In spring Robertson holds a spring festival, with local gardens open to the public.

Attractions

Robertson Hotel

Robertson is home to the "Robertson Hotel", a popular hotel and wedding venue. The hotel was originally built in 1924, opening as Hotel Robertson. It had a nine-hole golf course, two tennis courts, croquet, lawn bowls, billiards, fishing, hunting, horse riding, and an onsite mechanic who looked after guests' cars during their stay. The hotel won the "Most luxurious hotel in the Commonwealth" award in 1925, and was the first hotel in Australia to have phone lines to every room.

The hotel was built to draw some of the Sydneysiders, who in the past retreated to the cool climate of the Southern Highlands to escape the heat of a Sydney summer and enjoy the beauty of the countryside. It was a success and the developer went on to subdivide and develop the local area, less successfully.

In 1930 the hotel was sold and marketed as an exclusive country club and renamed Ranelagh Country Club after Ranelagh Gardens in London. However, the Great Depression made those plans short lived.

In the buildup to World War II the hotel became a WAAAF training base, serving as a signals base and a training area for budding pilots. After World War II, the hotel was used as a hospice for returned pilots.

The building sold again in 1947 and became St Anthony's College, a Franciscan friary and seminary; it was also used as a school and accommodation house run by the monks. It was during this period that the stained glass windows, rock walls and fountains were built. These are still in the building and around the gardens and grounds.

The hotel has its own railway platform, Moss Vale – Unanderra line, which is still used today.

In 1972 the monks moved to smaller premises in Campbelltown and the building returned to its original use as a hotel, named Ranelagh House.

The hotel was sold again in late 2007, and was renamed Fountaindale Grand Manor and Ranelagh Gardens, undergoing major renovations and refurbishments. Recently it was renamed to Robertson Hotel.

In 2022, the TV show The Traitors was filmed there.

Illawarra Fly

On 15 March 2008, the Illawarra Fly Tree Top Walk opened to the public. It is similar to the Otway Fly, in Victoria. It is perched on the Illawarra escarpment at Knights Hill, located east of Robertson. The tree top walk is joined with an observation outdoor tower with views of Wollongong. It is expected to have approximately 200,000 visitors every year.

The Big Potato
Built in 1977 by local potato grower Jim Mauger, the Big Potato sits off the Illawarra Highway. It was modelled on the Sebago potato and is approximately ten metres long and four metres wide. The structure was originally meant to house a Potato Information Centre but rising costs proved an obstacle. Recently the locals of Robertson have worked together to turn the surrounding land into a park.

Transport 

Robertson was served by a railway station on the Unanderra–Moss Vale railway line. The railway line is mainly used for freight. East Coast Heritage Rail operates its Cockatoo Run train on a monthly basis across the line from Sydney to Moss Vale and return (via Wollongong).  Other heritage trains sometimes use the line, however no regular passenger services are present on the line.

CountryLink buses travel along the Illawarra Highway, linking the Southern Highlands to Wollongong. The Illawarra Highway winds down the escarpment via the Macquarie Pass. Robertson would be impacted by an upgrade or replacement to Macquarie Pass. Despite some Illawarra and Highland residents strongly supporting an improvement to the link between Robertson and Albion Park, no government has shown any interest in such a project.

Facilities and services
The Robertson Rural Fire Brigade has been officially active since 5 February 1939, but is believed to have been formed by local people on 14 January, in response to catastrophic bushfires at that time.

Heritage listings 
Robertson has a number of heritage-listed sites, including the Wingecarribee Swamp.

Notable residents 
 Nathan Hindmarsh, Parramatta Eels NRL player who grew up in the town. Born in Bowral.
 Ian Hindmarsh, brother of Nathan and retired NRL player. Born in Bowral.
 Noeline Brown, Australian entertainer.
 Bob Dwyer, former Australian Wallabies rugby union coach
 Brett Lee, Australian cricketer, owns property near town
 Miriam Margolyes, British-born actress
 Ben Quilty, award-winning artist
 John Waters, English-born actor
 Kyle Sandilands, radio host
 Collette Dinnigan, fashion designer

References

External links 
 Robertson NSW

Towns of the Southern Highlands (New South Wales)
Wingecarribee Shire